Giacomo Antonio Carrozza (died 1560) was a Roman Catholic prelate who served as Bishop of Conversano (1534–1560).

Biography
In 1534, Giacomo Antonio Carrozza was appointed during the papacy of Pope Clement VII as Bishop of Conversano.
He served as Bishop of Conversano until his death in 1560.

References 

16th-century Italian Roman Catholic bishops
Bishops appointed by Pope Clement VII
1560 deaths